Joseph Francis McKinley (7 August 1911 – 15 October 1961) was an  Australian rules footballer who played with Fitzroy in the Victorian Football League (VFL).

Family
The son of Edward Thomas McKinley (1857–1931), and Margaret Agnes McKinley (1867–1952), née Hickey, Joseph Francis McKinley was born at Timor West on 7 August 1911.

He married Margaret Mary Cattanach (1918–1997) in 1945.

Death
He died at Kew, Victoria on 15 October 1961.

Notes

References
 
 World War Two Nominal Roll: Warrant Officer Class 2 Joseph Francis McKinley (VX115601), Department of Veterans' Affairs.
 B883, VX115601: World War Two Service Record: Warrant Officer Class 2 Joseph Francis McKinley (VX115601), National Archives of Australia.

External links 

Joe McKinley's playing statistics from The VFA Project.

1911 births
1961 deaths
Australian rules footballers from Victoria (Australia)
Fitzroy Football Club players
People from Maryborough, Victoria